Orlando Mack Barnes (November 21, 1824 – November 11, 1899) was an American lawyer and politician.

Born in Cato, Cayuga County, New York, Barnes moved with his parents to Aurelius, Ingham County, Michigan, in 1837. Barnes went to the local schools and then graduated from University of Michigan. He studied law at the University of Michigan and was admitted to the Michigan bar. Barnes practiced law and then was involved with the railroad business. He served as prosecuting attorney for Ingham County. In 1862 and 1863, Barnes served in the Michigan House of Representatives and was a Democrat. In 1877, Barnes served as Mayor of Lansing, Michigan. His son Orlando F. Barnes also served as mayor of Lansing, Michigan. Barnes died in Lansing, Michigan.

Notes

1824 births
1899 deaths
People from Cayuga County, New York
Mayors of Lansing, Michigan
University of Michigan alumni
Businesspeople from Michigan
Michigan lawyers
Democratic Party members of the Michigan House of Representatives
19th-century American politicians
19th-century American lawyers
19th-century American businesspeople